In metal typesetting, a font is a particular size, weight and style of a typeface. Each font is a matched set of type, with a piece (a "sort") for each glyph. A typeface consists of various fonts that share an overall design. 

In modern usage, with the advent of computer fonts, the term "font" has come to be used as a synonym for "typeface", although a typical typeface (or "font family") consists of several fonts. The term "font" is correctly applied to any one of these alone but may be seen used loosely to refer to the whole typeface. When used in computers, each style is in a separate digital "font file".

In both traditional typesetting and modern usage, the word "font" refers to the delivery mechanism of the typeface. In traditional typesetting, the font would be made from metal or wood type: to compose a page may require multiple fonts or even multiple typefaces.

Etymology
The word font (traditionally spelled fount in British English, but in any case pronounced ) derives from Middle French fonte  that has been] melted; a casting". The term refers to the process of casting metal type at a type foundry.

Metal type

In a manual printing (letterpress) house the word "font" would refer to a complete set of metal type that would be used to typeset an entire page. Upper- and lowercase letters get their names because of which case the metal type was located in for manual typesetting: the more distant upper case or the closer lower case. The same distinction is also referred to with the terms majuscule and minuscule.

Unlike a digital typeface, a metal font would not include a single definition of each character, but commonly used characters (such as vowels and periods) would have more physical type-pieces included. A font when bought new would often be sold as (for example in a Roman alphabet) 12pt 14A 34a, meaning that it would be a size 12-point font containing 14 uppercase "A"s, and 34 lowercase "A"s.

The rest of the characters would be provided in quantities appropriate for the distribution of letters in that language. Some metal type characters required in typesetting, such as dashes, spaces and line-height spacers, were not part of a specific font, but were generic pieces that could be used with any font. Line spacing is still often called "leading", because the strips used for line spacing were made of lead (rather than the harder alloy used for other pieces). This spacing strip was made from lead because lead was a softer metal than the traditional forged metal type pieces (which was part lead, antimony and tin) and would compress more easily when "locked up" in the printing "chase" (i.e. a carrier for holding all the type together).

In the 1880s–1890s, "hot lead" typesetting was invented, in which type was cast as it was set, either piece by piece (as in the Monotype technology) or in entire lines of type at one time (as in the Linotype technology).

Characteristics
In addition to the character height, when using the mechanical sense of the term, there are several characteristics which may distinguish fonts, though they would also depend on the script(s) that the typeface supports. In European alphabetic scripts, i.e. Latin, Cyrillic and Greek, the main such properties are the stroke width, called weight, the style or angle and the character width.

The regular or standard font is sometimes labeled roman, both to distinguish it from bold or thin and from italic or oblique. The keyword for the default, regular case is often omitted for variants and never repeated, otherwise it would be Bulmer regular italic, Bulmer bold regular and even Bulmer regular regular. Roman can also refer to the language coverage of a font, acting as a shorthand for "Western European".

Different fonts of the same typeface may be used in the same work for various degrees of readability and emphasis, or in a specific design to make it be of more visual interest.

Weight
The weight of a particular font is the thickness of the character outlines relative to their height.

A typeface may come in fonts of many weights, from ultra-light to extra-bold or black; four to six weights are not unusual, and a few typefaces have as many as a dozen. Many typefaces for office, web and non-professional use come with a normal and a bold weight which are linked together. If no bold weight is provided, many renderers (browsers, word processors, graphic and DTP programs) support a bolder font by rendering the outline a second time at an offset, or smearing it slightly at a diagonal angle.

The base weight differs among typefaces; that means one font may appear bolder than another font. For example, fonts intended to be used in posters are often bold by default while fonts for long runs of text are rather light. Weight designations in font names may differ in regard to the actual absolute stroke weight or density of glyphs in the font.

Attempts to systematize a range of weights led to a numerical classification first used by Adrian Frutiger with the Univers typeface: 35 Extra Light, 45 Light, 55 Medium or Regular, 65 Bold, 75 Extra Bold, 85 Extra Bold, 95 Ultra Bold or Black.
Deviants of these were the "6 series" (italics), e.g. 46 Light Italics etc., the "7 series" (condensed versions), e.g. 57 Medium Condensed etc., and the "8 series" (condensed italics), e.g. 68 Bold Condensed Italics.
From this brief numerical system it is easier to determine exactly what a font's characteristics are, for instance "Helvetica 67" (HE67) translates to "Helvetica Bold Condensed".

The first algorithmic description of fonts was made by Donald Knuth in his Metafont description language and interpreter.

The TrueType font format introduced a scale from 100 through 900, which is also used in CSS and OpenType, where 400 is regular (roman or plain). 

The Mozilla Developer Network provides the following rough mapping to typical font weight names:

Font mapping varies by font designer. A good example is Bigelow and Holmes's Go Go font family. In this family, the "fonts have CSS numerical weights of 400, 500, and 600. Although CSS specifies 'Bold' as a 700 weight and 600 as Semibold or Demibold, the Go numerical weights match the actual progression of the ratios of stem thicknesses: Normal:Medium = 400:500; Normal:Bold = 400:600".

The terms normal, regular and plain (sometimes book) are used for the standard-weight font of a typeface. Where both appear and differ, book is often lighter than regular, but in some typefaces it is bolder.

Before the arrival of computers, each weight had to be drawn manually. As a result, many older multi-weight families such as Gill Sans and Monotype Grotesque have considerable differences in weights from light to extra-bold. Since the 1980s, it has become common to use automation to construct a range of weights as points along a trend, multiple master or other parameterized font design. This means that many modern digital fonts such as Myriad and TheSans are offered in a large range of weights which offer a smooth and continuous transition from one weight to the next, although some digital fonts are created with extensive manual corrections.

As digital font design allows more variants to be created faster, a common development in professional font design is the use of "grades": slightly different weights intended for different types of paper and ink, or printing in a different region with different ambient temperature and humidity. For example, a thin design printed on book paper and a thicker design printed on high-gloss magazine paper may come out looking identical, since in the former case the ink will soak and spread out more. Grades are offered with characters having the same width on all grades, so that a change of printing materials does not affect copy-fit. Grades are common on serif fonts with their finer details.

Fonts in which the bold and non-bold letters have the same width are “duplexed”.

Style

Slope 
In European typefaces, especially Roman ones, a slope or slanted style is used to emphasize important words. This is called italic type or oblique type. These designs normally slant to the right in left-to-right scripts. Oblique styles are often called italic, but differ from "true italic" styles.

Italic styles are more flowing than the normal typeface, approaching a more handwritten, cursive style, possibly using ligatures more commonly or gaining swashes. 
Although rarely encountered, a typographic face may be accompanied by a matching calligraphic face (cursive, script), giving an exaggeratedly italic style.

In many sans-serif and some serif typefaces, especially in those with strokes of even thickness, the characters of the italic fonts are only slanted, which is often done algorithmically, without otherwise changing their appearance. Such oblique fonts are not true italics, because lowercase letter shapes do not change, but are often marketed as such. Fonts normally do not include both oblique and italic styles: the designer chooses to supply one or the other.

Since italic styles clearly look different to regular (roman) styles, it is possible to have "upright italic" designs that take a more cursive form but remain upright; Computer Modern is an example of a font that offers this style. In Latin-script countries, upright italics are rare but are sometimes used in mathematics or in complex documents where a section of text already in italics needs a "double italic" style to add emphasis to it. For example, the Cyrillic minuscule "т" may look like a smaller form of its majuscule "Т" or more like a roman small "m" as in its standard italic appearance; in this case the distinction between styles is also a matter of local preference.

Other style attributes
In Frutiger's nomenclature the second digit for upright fonts is a 5, for italic fonts a 6 and for condensed italic fonts an 8.

The two Japanese syllabaries, katakana and hiragana, are sometimes seen as two styles or typographic variants of each other, but usually are considered separate character sets as a few of the characters have separate kanji origins and the scripts are used for different purposes. The gothic style of the roman script with broken letter forms, on the other hand, is usually considered a mere typographic variant.

Cursive-only scripts such as Arabic also have different styles, in this case for example Naskh and Kufic, although these often depend on application, area or era.

There are other aspects that can differ among font styles, but more often these are considered intrinsic features of the typeface. These include the look of digits (text figures) and the minuscules, which may be smaller versions of the capital letters (small caps) although the script has developed characteristic shapes for them. Some typefaces do not include separate glyphs for the cases at all, thereby abolishing the bicamerality. While most of these use uppercase characters only, some labeled unicase exist which choose either the majuscule or the minuscule glyph at a common height for both characters.

Titling fonts are designed for headlines and displays, and have stroke widths optimized for large sizes.

Width

Some typefaces include fonts that vary the width of the characters (stretch), although this feature is usually rarer than weight or slope. Narrower fonts are usually labeled compressed, condensed or narrow. In Frutiger's system, the second digit of condensed fonts is a 7. 
Wider fonts may be called wide, extended or expanded. 
Both can be further classified by prepending extra, ultra or the like. Compressing a font design to a condensed weight is a complex task, requiring the strokes to be slimmed down proportionally and often making the capitals straight-sided. It is particularly common to see condensed fonts for sans-serif and slab-serif families, since it is relatively practical to modify their structure to a condensed weight. Serif text faces are often only issued in the regular width.

These separate fonts have to be distinguished from techniques that alter the letter-spacing to achieve narrower or smaller words, especially for justified text alignment.

Most typefaces either have proportional or monospaced (for example, those resembling typewriter output) letter widths, if the script provides the possibility. Some superfamilies include both proportional and monospaced fonts. Some fonts also provide both proportional and fixed-width (tabular) digits, where the former usually coincide with lowercase text figures and the latter with uppercase lining figures.

The width of a font will depend on its intended use. Times New Roman was designed with the goal of having small width, to fit more text into a newspaper. On the other hand, Palatino has large width to increase readability. The "billing block" on a movie poster often uses extremely condensed type in order to meet union requirements on the people who must be credited and the font height relative to the rest of the poster.

Optical size

Some professional digital typefaces include fonts that are optimised for certain sizes, for instance by using a thinner stroke weight if they are intended for large-size display use, or by using ink traps if they are to be printed at small size on poor-quality paper. This was a natural feature in the metal type period for most typefaces, since each size would be cut separately and made to its own slightly different design. As an example of this, experienced Linotype designer Chauncey H. Griffith commented in 1947 that for a type he was working on intended for newspaper use, the 6 point size was not 50% as wide as the 12 point size, but about 71%. However, it declined in use as pantograph engraving, and especially phototypesetting and digital fonts made printing the same font at any size simpler. A mild revival has taken place in recent years. Optical sizes are more common for serif fonts, since their typically finer detail and higher contrast benefits more from being bulked up for smaller sizes and made less overpowering at larger ones.

There are several naming schemes for such variant designs. One such scheme, invented and popularized by Adobe Systems, refers to the variant fonts by the applications they are typically used for, with the exact point sizes intended varying slightly by typeface:
 Poster Extremely large sizes, usually larger than 72 point
 Display Large sizes, typically 19–72 point
 Subhead Large text, typically about 14–18 point
 (Regular) Usually left unnamed, typically about 10–13 point
 Small Text (SmText) Typically about 8–10 point
 Caption Very small, typically about 4–8 point

Metrics

Font metrics refers to metadata consisting of numeric values relating to size and space in the font overall, or in its individual glyphs. Font-wide metrics include cap height (the height of the capitals), x-height (the height of the lowercase letters) and ascender height, descender depth, and the font bounding box. Glyph-level metrics include the glyph bounding box, the advance width (the proper distance between the glyph's initial pen position and the next glyph's initial pen position), and sidebearings (space that pads the glyph outline on either side). Many digital (and some metal type) fonts are able to be kerned so that characters can be fitted more closely; the pair "Wa" is a common example of this.

Some fonts, especially those intended for professional use, are duplexed: made with multiple weights having the same character width so that (for example) changing from regular to bold or italic does not affect word wrap. Sabon as originally designed was a notable example of this. (This was a standard feature of the Linotype hot metal typesetting system with regular and italic being duplexed, requiring awkward design choices as italics normally are narrower than the roman.)

A particularly important basic set of fonts that became an early standard in digital printing was the Core Font Set included in the PostScript printing system developed by Apple and Adobe. To avoid paying licensing fees for this set, many computer companies commissioned "metrically compatible" knock-off fonts with the same spacing, which could be used to display the same document without it seeming clearly different. Arial and Century Gothic are notable examples of this, being functional equivalents to the PostScript standard fonts Helvetica and ITC Avant Garde respectively. Some of these sets were created in order to be freely redistributable, for example Red Hat's Liberation fonts and Google's Croscore fonts, which duplicate the PostScript set and other common fonts used in Microsoft software such as Calibri. It is not a requirement that a metrically compatible design be identical to its origin in appearance apart from width.

Serifs
Although most typefaces are characterised by their use of serifs, there are superfamilies that incorporate serif (antiqua) and sans-serif (grotesque) or even intermediate slab serif (Egyptian) or semi-serif fonts with the same base outlines.

A more common font variant, especially of serif typefaces, is that of alternate capitals. They can have swashes to go with italic minuscules or they can be of a flourish design for use as initials (drop caps).

Character variants 

Typefaces may be made in variants for different uses. These may be issued as separate font files, or the different characters may be included in the same font file if the font is a modern format such as OpenType and the application used can support this.

Alternative characters are often called stylistic alternates. These may be switched on to allow users more flexibility to customise the font to suit their needs. The practice is not new: in the 1930s, Gill Sans, a British design, was sold abroad with alternative characters to make it resemble fonts such as Futura popular in other countries, while Bembo from the same period has two shapes of "R": one with a stretched-out leg, matching its fifteenth-century model, and one less-common shorter version. With modern digital fonts, it is possible to group related alternative characters into stylistic sets, which may be turned on and off together. For example, in Williams Caslon Text, a revival of the 18th century font Caslon, the default italic forms have many swashes matching the original design. For a more spare appearance, these can all be turned off at once by engaging stylistic set 4. Junicode, intended for academic publishing, uses ss15 to enable a variant form of "e" used in medieval Latin. A corporation commissioning a modified version of a commercial font for their own use, meanwhile, might request that their preferred alternates be set to default.

It is common for fonts intended for use in books for young children to use simplified, single-storey forms of the lowercase letters a and g (sometimes also y and l); these may be called infant or schoolbook alternates. They are traditionally believed to be easier for children to read and less confusing as they resemble the forms used in handwriting. Often schoolbook characters are released as a supplement to popular families such as Akzidenz-Grotesk, Gill Sans and Bembo; a well-known font intended specifically for school use is Sassoon Sans.

Besides alternate characters, in the metal type era The New York Times commissioned custom condensed single sorts for common long names that might often appear in news headings, such as "Eisenhower", "Chamberlain" or "Rockefeller".

Digits

Fonts can have multiple kinds of digits, including, as described above, proportional (variable width) and tabular (fixed width) as well as lining (uppercase height) and text (lowercase height) figures. They may also include separate shapes for superscript and subscript digits. Professional fonts may include even more complex settings for typesetting digits, such as digits intended to match the height of small caps. In addition, some fonts such as Adobe’s Acumin and Christian Schwartz’s Neue Haas Grotesk digitisation offer two heights of lining (uppercase height) figures: one slightly lower than cap height, intended to blend better into continuous text, and one at exactly the cap height to look better in combination with capitals for uses such as UK postcodes. With the OpenType format, it is possible to bundle all these into a single digital font file, but earlier font releases may have only one type per file.

See also 
 Clip font
 Font embedding
 Graphics
 List of typefaces

References

Notes

Further reading 
Blackwell, Lewis. 20th Century Type. Yale University Press: 2004. .
Fiedl, Frederich, Nicholas Ott and Bernard Stein. Typography: An Encyclopedic Survey of Type Design and Techniques Through History. Black Dog & Leventhal: 1998. .
Lupton, Ellen. Thinking with Type: A Critical Guide for Designers, Writers, Editors, & Students, Princeton Architectural Press: 2004. .
Headley, Gwyn. The Encyclopaedia of Fonts. Cassell Illustrated: 2005. .
Macmillan, Neil. An A–Z of Type Designers. Yale University Press: 2006. .

Typesetting
Typography
Articles containing video clips